Samuel Warmack (1899 – death unknown) was an American Negro league outfielder between 1922 and 1933.

Early life and career
Warmack made his Negro leagues debut in 1922 for the Richmond Giants. He played for the Hilldale Club in 1929, the Washington Pilots in 1932, and finished his career with the Bacharach Giants in 1932 and 1933.

References

Further reading
 Globe staff (May 30, 1928). "Colored Diamond Star Sam Warmack". The Toronto Globe. p. 11
 Afro-American staff (July 6, 1929). "Black Sox Sign Two New Players". Baltimore Afro-American. p. 15
 Post-Star staff (June 24, 1931). "Clintons to Meet Local Nine Today; Schenectady Club to Sub for Mohawk Giants; Four Players of Latter Injured" The Glen Falls Post-Star. p. 9

External links
 and Baseball-Reference Black Baseball stats and Seamheads

1899 births
Date of birth missing
Year of death missing
Place of birth missing
Place of death missing
Bacharach Giants players
Hilldale Club players
Washington Pilots players
Baseball outfielders